The 2020 Delaware gubernatorial election was held on November 3, 2020, to elect the Governor of Delaware, concurrently with the 2020 U.S. presidential election, as well as elections to the United States Senate and elections to the United States House of Representatives and various state and local elections. Incumbent Democratic Governor John Carney was re-elected to a second term, defeating Republican Julianne Murray in a landslide.

Democratic primary

Candidates

Nominee
John Carney, incumbent Governor of Delaware

Eliminated in the primary
David Lamar Williams Jr., accountant and community activist

Results

Results by county

Republican primary
The Republican primary was hotly contested between Julianne Murray, an attorney from Georgetown, and Colin Bonini, a Delaware State Senator from the 16th district and the Republican nominee for the Governor of Delaware in 2016. Murray ended up winning the nomination. Although Bonini won Kent and New Castle counties, the latter of which is home to Wilmington and is the most populous county in the state, Murray won Sussex County, which is the most Republican county in the state and overall had the most votes, allowing her to carry the nomination.

Candidates

Nominee
Julianne Murray, attorney

Eliminated in the primary
 Colin Bonini, state senator, nominee for Delaware State Treasurer in 2010, and nominee for Governor of Delaware in 2016
David Bosco, small business owner
David Graham
Bryant Richardson, state senator
Scott Walker, 2018 Republican Nominee for the United States House of Representatives in Delaware

Withdrawn
Neil Shea, brewer, U.S. Marine Corps veteran
Kevin Baron, veteran

Results

Results by county

Other candidates

Libertarian Party

Nominee
John Machurek

Independent Party of Delaware

Nominee
Kathy DeMatteis

General election

Predictions

Polling

Results

Notes

References

External links
Official campaign websites
 John Carney (D) for Governor
 Kathy DeMatteis (IPoD) for Governor
 Julianne Murray (R) for Governor

2020
Governor
Delaware